

Albert Stecken (24 January 1915 – 24 August 2011) was an officer in the Fallschirmjäger of Nazi Germany during World War II and a general in the Bundeswehr of West Germany.  He was  a recipient of the Knight's Cross of the Iron Cross.

Awards and decorations
 Wehrmacht Long Service Award 4th Class (14 February 1939)
 Medalla de la Campaña (4 May 1939)
 Spanish Cruz de Guerra (4 May 1939)
 Spanish Cross in Gold with Swords (6 June 1939)
 Iron Cross (1939)   2nd Class (24 April 1940) & 1st Class (28 June 1940)
 Narvik Shield (30 January 1941)
 Knight's Cross of the Iron Cross on 28 April 1945 as Major im Generalstab and Ia (operations officer) of the 8. Fallschirmjäger-Division

References

Citations

Bibliography

 
 

1915 births
2011 deaths
Military personnel from Münster
People from the Province of Westphalia
Bundeswehr generals
Fallschirmjäger of World War II
German military personnel of the Spanish Civil War
Recipients of the Knight's Cross of the Iron Cross
Commanders Crosses of the Order of Merit of the Federal Republic of Germany
German prisoners of war in World War II held by the United Kingdom
German male equestrians
Condor Legion personnel
Major generals of the German Army